Arbaaz Ali Khan is a film and television actor and son of veteran actor Ajit.

Early life
Arbaaz Ali Khan was born in Mumbai on 28 November 1969. He was brought up in Bandra, Mumbai and is the son of late veteran actor Ajit Khan.

Filmography
Police Public (1990) as Shyamsunder Swarup
Solah Satra (1990) as Vicky
Mrityudaata (1997) as Bharat
Talaash: The Hunt Begins... (2003) as Rocky
Taj Mahal: An Eternal Love Story (2005) as Jahangir
Black Friday (1997 film) (1997) as Javed Chikna
Karam Apna Apna (2006-2009) as Moksh Kapoor
Devon Ke Dev...Mahadev (2014) as Lord Krishna's Brother, Lord Balram
Sarabjit (2016)

External links

Living people
1969 births
Indian male actors
21st-century Indian actors
Indian Muslims
Indian people of Afghan descent